The 2022 CONCACAF U-20 Championship was an international football tournament held in Honduras from 18 June to 3 July 2022. The twenty participating national teams were required to register a squad of twenty players, of which two had to be goalkeepers.

The age listed for each player is on 18 June 2022, the first day of the tournament. The numbers of caps and goals listed for each player do not include any matches played after the start of the tournament. The club listed is the club for which the player last played a competitive match before the tournament. The nationality for each club reflects the national association (not the league) to which the club is affiliated. A flag is included for coaches who are of a different nationality than their own national team.

Group stage

Group E

Canada 
Coach: Mauro Biello

Canada's 20-man squad was announced on 10 June 2022.

Cuba 
Coach: Pablo Elier Sánchez

Cuba's 20-man squad was announced on 10 June 2022.

 Names in italics denote players who have been capped for the senior team.

Saint Kitts and Nevis

United States 

Obed Vargas withdrew injured and was replaced by Jackson Hopkins.

 Names in italics denote players who have been capped for the senior team.

Group F

Haiti

Mexico

Suriname

Trinidad and Tobago 
 Names in italics denote players who have been capped for the senior team.

Group G

Aruba 
 Names in italics denote players who have been capped for the senior team.

El Salvador 
 Names in italics denote players who have been capped for the senior team.

Guatemala

Panama 
 Names in italics denote players who have been capped for the senior team.

Group H

Antigua and Barbuda 
 Names in italics denote players who have been capped for the senior team.

Costa Rica 
 Names in italics denote players who have been capped for the senior team.

Honduras

Jamaica 
 Names in italics denote players who have been capped for the senior team.

Knockout stage

Curaçao 
 Names in italics denote players who have been capped for the senior team.

Dominican Republic 
 Names in italics denote players who have been capped for the senior team.

Nicaragua 
 Names in italics denote players who have been capped for the senior team.

Puerto Rico 
 Names in italics denote players who have been capped for the senior team.

Notes

References 

CONCACAF Under-20 Championship squads
squads